Viimsi Parish is a rural municipality in Northern Estonia, located North-East and neighbouring the capital Tallinn. The municipality contains the Viimsi Peninsula and several islands, including Naissaar, Prangli, and Aksi.

The mayor of Viimsi Parish is Illar Lemetti.

Divisions
There are two small boroughs and 20 villages in Viimsi Parish.

Small boroughs
Viimsi and Haabneeme.

Villages
Äigrumäe, Idaotsa, Kelnase, Kelvingi, Laiaküla, Leppneeme, Lõunaküla (Storbyn), Lubja, Lääneotsa, Metsakasti, Miiduranna, Muuga, Pringi, Pärnamäe, Püünsi, Randvere, Rohuneeme, Tagaküla (Bakbyn), Tammneeme, Väikeheinamaa (Lillängin).

Religion

International relations

Twin towns — Sister cities
Viimsi Parish is twinned with:
 Barleben, Germany
 Porvoo, Finland
 Ski Municipality, Norway
 Sulejówek, Poland
 Täby Municipality, Sweden
 Ramat Yishai, Israel

See also
Viimsi JK
Viimsi Stadium

References

External links
 

 
Municipalities of Estonia